Mahoning Creek Dam is a dam in Armstrong County, Pennsylvania.

The concrete gravity dam was constructed in 1941 by the United States Army Corps of Engineers, with a height of 162 feet, and a length of 926 feet at its crest.  It impounds Mahoning Creek, a tributary of the Allegheny River, primarily for flood control.  It's one of sixteen flood control projects in the area.  The dam is owned and operated by the Pittsburgh District, Great Lakes and Ohio River Division, Army Corps of Engineers.

In 2012 the dam was retrofitted for hydroelectric power generation which produces about 6 MW.

Recreation includes boating, fishing, camping, hiking, and the facilities of the state-run Mahoning Creek Lake Park. It is located between Redbank Township and Wayne Township in Armstrong County.

References

External links

Dams in Pennsylvania
Reservoirs in Pennsylvania
United States Army Corps of Engineers dams
Dams completed in 1941
Energy infrastructure completed in 1941
Buildings and structures in Armstrong County, Pennsylvania
Hydroelectric power plants in Pennsylvania
Gravity dams
Historic American Buildings Survey in Pennsylvania